Sara Stern-Katan (born 4 June 1919, died 23 September 2001) was an Israeli social worker and politician who served as a member of the Knesset for the National Religious Party between 1977 and 1981.

Biography
Born in Łódź in 1919, Stern-Katan helped organise educational activities for the Torah VeAvoda movement in Poland and Germany, and was active in the Zionist underground during World War II. She studied social work at Simmons College in Boston and made aliyah to Israel in 1947.

A member of the board of the National Religious Women's Movement, she was the director of the Department of Professional Counseling for girls and women and the development of girl’s vocational boarding schools, a member of the Center of the Association for Social Services and a member of the Ministry of Education-affiliated Education Council. She also lectured in social work at Bar-Ilan University.

In 1977 she was elected to the Knesset on the National Religious Party list, and was a member of theEducation and Culture Committee, the Constitution, Law and Justice Committee, the Labor and Welfare Committee, the State Control Committee and the Education and Culture Committee. She lost her seat in the 1981 elections.

She died in 2001 at the age of 82.

Awards
In 1988, Stern-Katan was awarded the Israel Prize, for her special contribution to the society and the State of Israel.

See also
List of Israel Prize recipients

References

External links

1919 births
2001 deaths
Israeli social workers
Women members of the Knesset
National Religious Party politicians
Israel Prize for special contribution to society and the State recipients
Israel Prize women recipients
Simmons University alumni
Polish emigrants to Mandatory Palestine
20th-century Polish Jews
Politicians from Łódź
Members of the 9th Knesset (1977–1981)
20th-century Israeli women politicians
Jewish Israeli politicians
Polish expatriates in the United States